is a racing simulation arcade video game based on the actual race car and Ferrari event. It was developed by the AM2 division of Sega for the Sega Naomi Multiboard arcade system board under the direction of Yu Suzuki, and was later ported to the Dreamcast and PlayStation 2 home video game consoles under the names F355 Challenge: Passione Rossa and  respectively for both American and European releases. The only model of car featured in the game is the Ferrari F355 Challenge model. The game was considered the most accurate simulation of the F355 possible up until that time.

Some versions of the arcade cabinet are noteworthy for having three screens, allowing the player to look through the side windows as they would in a real car. The three-screen cabinet version also features an H-shaped gear stick and three foot pedals, and presents a tough challenge to any player who decides to use them. The cabinet itself is composed of four NAOMI units: one for each of the three screens and one to sync them all. The game also allows the player to use an automatic transmission or paddle-shift the gears. It also uses a real-time "Magic Weather" system similar to Shenmue. The Dreamcast version has link cable play for direct competition; however, as of January 2006, the online servers for F355 Challenge are now offline, and the website has gone offline.

The game features an original soundtrack featuring Genki Hitomi and Minoru Niihara that mimics the style of 1980s hard rock/heavy metal which is integrated into a radio station format during gameplay (some music was later reused for another AM2 game, Shenmue). The radio DJ and the announcer are played by Alan J (Alan John Peppler), an American DJ who works at the Japanese radio station Bay FM.

Yu Suzuki is a keen Ferrari enthusiast who allegedly used data from his own Ferrari 355 at certain tracks to implement in the game during its development.

Circuits

The 1999 arcade version of the game includes six circuits:
 Motegi (Oval Circuit)
 Suzuka (Short Configuration)
 Monza (1998 configuration)
 Sugo
 Suzuka (Full Configuration)
 Long Beach

In addition, the home console versions of the game include five extra unlockable circuits:
 Atlanta
 Nürburgring
 Laguna Seca
 Sepang
 Fiorano (real life track used by Ferrari to test their cars)

All these circuits can be unlocked by either finishing in certain positions in a certain race or championship, driving over a certain cumulative distance in the game, or by entering a password in a revealable password entry screen. These tracks were also included in the F355 Challenge 2: International Course Edition arcade machine, released in 2001.

Development
The game was announced at E3 2000.

Reception

Passione Rossa received "generally favorable reviews", while Ferrari F355 Challenge received "average" reviews, according to the review aggregation website Metacritic. John Gaudiosi of NextGen said that the former "offers plenty of eye candy and deep gameplay for dedicated, hardcore Ferrari aficionados." In Japan, Famitsu gave it a score of 29 out of 40 for the same console version, and 27 out of 40 for the latter one.

Also in Japan, Game Machine listed the arcade version in their January 1, 2000 issue as the seventh most-successful dedicated arcade game of the past year.

The same arcade version won the award for Coin-op of the Year at the Edge Awards 2000, while Passione Rossa was a runner-up for GameSpots annual "Best Driving Game" award, which went to Test Drive Le Mans. It was also a finalist for the "Racing Game of the Year" award at the Academy of Interactive Arts & Sciences' 4th Annual Interactive Achievement Awards, which went to SSX.

See also

Out Run
Ferrari Challenge: Trofeo Pirelli

Notes

References

External links

Official websites
 Official Sega F355 Challenge Website 
 Official Ferrari Challenge Website

General resources
 F355 Challenge Vehicle Specifications, Profile, and Pictures

1999 video games
Arcade video games
Dreamcast games
Ferrari video games
Head-to-head arcade video games
PlayStation 2 games
Racing video games
Racing simulators
Sega-AM2 games
Sega arcade games
Video games developed in Japan
Video games set in California
Video games set in Georgia (U.S. state)
Video games set in Germany
Video games set in Italy
Video games set in Japan
Video games set in Malaysia
Video games designed by Yu Suzuki